The Lists of breeds refer to listed breeds of domesticated animals.

Lists of breeds

See also 
 
 List of animal names
 Biodiversity
 Rare breed
 Entente Européenne d'Aviculture et de Cuniculture
 Rare Breeds Survival Trust
 Lists of poultry breeds

domestic animal breeds
breeds